Edner Brutus (20 April 1911 – 6 November 1980) was a Haitian politician, diplomat, and historian. He served as Foreign Minister of Haiti from 1974 to 1978, and as a historian he is best known for his book Révolution dans Saint-Domingue (1969). His father, Timoléon C. Brutus, was also a prominent politician and historian.

See also
Liévano–Brutus treaty

References

 

Haitian diplomats
20th-century Haitian historians
Haitian male writers
Foreign Ministers of Haiti
1911 births
1980 deaths